Somassi, Boulkiemdé is a village in the Pella Department of Boulkiemdé Province in central western Burkina Faso. It has a population of 965.

References

Populated places in Boulkiemdé Province